Jace Evan Sternberger (born June 26, 1996) is an American football tight end for the Birmingham Stallions of the United States Football League (USFL). He played college football at Northeastern Oklahoma A&M College, Kansas, and Texas A&M, where he was named a consensus All-American in 2018 with the latter. Sternberger was drafted by the Green Bay Packers in the third round of the 2019 NFL Draft.

Early years
At Kingfisher High School in Kingfisher, Oklahoma, Sternberger played various positions in football, both offensive and defensive. He initially played quarterback. After a shoulder injury during his sophomore season, his coaches moved him to tight end. In basketball, Sternberger played power forward. His experience in basketball put him in a better position to excel at tight end in football. As a junior, he was part of the state championship team that compiled a 14–0 record. As a senior in 2014, he made 42 receptions for 390 yards and eight touchdowns.

Sternberger received scholarship offers from various colleges, including Texas State, Kansas, New Mexico, and Sam Houston State. He chose to enroll at Kansas as part of then-head coach David Beaty's first recruiting class.

College career
During the 2015 season at Kansas, Sternberger took a redshirt.

In 2016, as a redshirt freshman, Sternberger recorded only one reception for 5 yards over 10 games. He was second on the depth chart behind Ben Johnson, who recorded 10 receptions for 112 yards and one touchdown that season. Kansas' offensive scheme did not provide enough opportunities for Sternberger to showcase his skills. During the 2016 season, Kansas tight ends only amassed 11 receptions. Due to the limited need of tight ends at Kansas and around the country, Sternberger transferred to Northeastern Oklahoma A&M. During the 2017 season at the junior college, he had 21 receptions for 336 yards and six touchdowns. Due to his junior college performance, Sternberger was recruited by several programs, including Boise State and Florida State. He was ranked as the 53rd-best junior college player by Rivals.com. During his recruitment, then-Florida State head coach Jimbo Fisher accepted the same position at Texas A&M. Sternberger chose to commit to Texas A&M due to Fisher's tight end-heavy offense, wide receivers coach Dameyune Craig's recruiting, and the opportunity to play in the SEC.

During the 2018 season, Sternberger received midseason All-America honors from CBS Sports, the Associated Press, Sports Illustrated, Athlon Sports, and ESPN. He was named one of eight semi-finalists for the John Mackey Award, given to the nation's top collegiate tight end. He was not selected as a finalist for the award, even though he had more touchdowns, receiving yards, and yards per reception than each of the three finalists. Despite not being selected as a Mackey Award finalist, Sternberger received first-team all-SEC honors and first-team All-America honors from the Associated Press, Athlon Sports, CBS Sports, Football Writers Association of America, Sporting News, Sports Illustrated, and the Walter Camp Football Foundation. He earned second-team All-American honors from USA Today. Since Sternberger was recognized by at least two of the five NCAA-recognized All-America team selectors (AP, AFCA, FWAA, TSN, and the WCFF), he became a consensus All-American.

Following his lone season at A&M, Sternberger decided to forgo his final year of eligibility and declare for the 2019 NFL Draft. He finished his career at A&M with 48 receptions for 832 yards and 10 touchdowns. His 10 touchdowns match the school record for most touchdowns by a tight end, and his 832 receiving yards ranked second nationally among all tight ends for the 2018 season.

Professional career

Green Bay Packers
Sternberger was drafted by the Green Bay Packers in the third round (75th overall) of the 2019 NFL Draft. On June 10, 2019, he signed his rookie contract. On September 3, 2019 Sternberger was placed on injured reserve to start the 2019 season. He was designated for return from injured reserve and began practicing on October 16, 2019. He was activated off injured reserve on November 2, 2019. He scored his first NFL touchdown in the NFC Championship against the San Francisco 49ers on an eight-yard reception from Aaron Rodgers in the 37–20 loss.

The Packers placed Sternberger on the reserve/COVID-19 list on July 30, 2020. He was activated on August 17, 2020.

Sternberger was suspended two games on June 10, 2021, after violating the NFL's substance-abuse policy. He was waived after returning from suspension on September 21, 2021.

Seattle Seahawks
Sternberger signed with the Seattle Seahawks' practice squad on September 23, 2021.

Washington Football Team
Sternberger signed with the Washington Football Team on October 6, 2021. He was waived on November 2, 2021.

Pittsburgh Steelers
On November 23, 2021, Sternberger was signed to the Pittsburgh Steelers practice squad. He signed a reserve/future contract with the Steelers on January 18, 2022. He was waived on August 30, 2022.

On November 11, 2022, the Cleveland Browns hosted Sternberger for a workout.

Birmingham Stallions
On January 26, 2023, Sternberger signed with the Birmingham Stallions of the United States Football League (USFL).

NFL career statistics

Regular season

Postseason

Personal life
Sternberger's parents, Jason and Jackie, were college athletes. Jackie was a basketball standout at Southwestern Oklahoma State University where she was a two time All-American. Sternberger lived in Clinton, Oklahoma for a good part of his youth where he met his good friend who he considers a brother. He has a tattoo of him on his left arm in honor of a childhood friend, Alfonso Reynaga, who died at the age of 13 of brain cancer. In November 2021, Sternberger welcomed a son with longtime girlfriend and model, Tayla Janae.

References

External links

Washington Football Team bio
Texas A&M Aggies bio

1996 births
Living people
21st-century American Jews
Jewish American sportspeople
American football tight ends
Texas A&M Aggies football players
Players of American football from Oklahoma
All-American college football players
People from Kingfisher, Oklahoma
Kansas Jayhawks football players
Northeastern Oklahoma A&M Golden Norsemen football players
Seattle Seahawks players
Green Bay Packers players
Washington Football Team players
Pittsburgh Steelers players
Birmingham Stallions (2022) players